Serve-Dieu Abailard "Armand" Lévy (14 November 1795 – 29 July 1841) was a French mathematician and mineralogist. He is remembered in the Haüy-Lévy notation for describing mineral crystal structures.

Life 
Lévy was born in Paris where his Jewish businessman father had married Céline Mailfert, a Catholic. Although his birth and death records have his given names as Serve-Dieu Abailard, he registered with the Geological Society of London under the name Armand. Armand Lévy studied mathematics, passing his agrégation in 1816 from the École Normale Supérieure. His Jewish origin prevented him from obtaining jobs in France and took up an offer Collège Royal on Reunion Island. While sailing to the Indian Ocean, his ship was wrecked off Plymouth. He then settled in London where he made a living by giving mathematics tuitions and in 1820 he met a mineral dealer, Henry Heuland, who asked him to categorise his collection as part of its sale to Charles Hampden Turner. In London he interacted with Wollaston and became a member of the Geological Society of London in 1826. In 1827, Lévy went to Belgium to supervise the printing of the Heuland mineral catalog.  He settled in Belgium and became a professor at the University of Liège. After the 1830 revolution, he returned to France and taught mathematics at the École Normale Supérieure in Paris. Lévy worked on a way of defining crystal structures which he based on as being derived from a parallelepiped with truncations of the edges and vertices. He used vowels for vertices and consonants for edges with the bounded planes characterized by their slope. This system was however superseded by the Miller system.
 
Lévy married Harriet Drewet in 1822 in London. Following her death and move to Paris, he married Amélie daughter of  mathematician Olinde Rodriquez in 1838. He died of an aneurysm.

Legacy 
Armand Lévy described many mineral species, such as babingtonite, beudantite, brochantite, brookite, forsterite, phillipsite, roselite and willemite. Lévyne was named after him.

References 

French mineralogists
1795 births
1841 deaths
19th-century French mathematicians
Academic staff of the University of Liège
Deaths from aneurysm